Walter Gray may refer to:

 Walter de Gray  (died 1255), English prelate and statesman
 Walter H. Gray (1898–1973), American bishop of the Episcopal Church in the United States of America
 Walter J. Gray, American politician and formed member of the Rhode Island State Senate